AFM Nurul Haque Hawladar was an Awami League politician and member of parliament for Faridpur-17.

Career
Hawladar was elected to parliament from Faridpur-17 as an Awami League candidate in 1973.

Death
Hawlader was shot dead on 31 May 1973 in his house in Naria, Shariatpur District.

References

Awami League politicians
1973 deaths
Assassinated Bangladeshi politicians
1st Jatiya Sangsad members
1973 murders in Bangladesh